R. Srinivasan is an Indian politician and was a member of the 14th Tamil Nadu Legislative Assembly  from the Arcot constituency. He represented the All India Anna Dravida Munnetra Kazhagam party.

The elections of 2016 resulted in his constituency being won by J. L. Eswarappan.

Business

He is the Proprietor of V. K. R. Millk Dairy situated at No. 2F/1, Gollapalayam, Arcot, Vellore - 632503, Tamil Nadu. which is the manufacturer and supplier of Dairy products, milk, ghee, flavoured milk.

References 

Tamil Nadu MLAs 2011–2016
All India Anna Dravida Munnetra Kazhagam politicians
Living people
Year of birth missing (living people)